In Iran, the Burnt Generation (Persian: نسل سوخته, Nasl-e Sukhteh) is the generation born between roughly 1966 and 1988, having experienced the Iranian Revolution, Iran–Iraq War, and political or social consequences of these such as the Iran hostage crisis, the 1980 Iranian Embassy Siege, the Iranian Cultural Revolution, 1988 executions of political prisoners, the 1989 fatwa against Salman Rushdie, and the Islamic revival, as children, teenagers and later as young adults. These events proved fundamental in deciding the very poor prospects and pessimistic outlook of this generation as they entered the workforce in Iran at the end of the 1980s, and throughout the 1990s. 

This generation resonates with Generation X and Millennials in the Western world. The earlier members of this cohort (roughly 1966 to 1979) were born at a time when the middle class had the majority, the country was prosperous and much more optimistic, higher education was extremely valued and hard work would promise a bright future, however were too young to take advantage of the benefits of this time when the Iranian Revolution in 1978-1979 destroyed these prospects. On the other hand, the second half of the cohort (born from 1979 to 1988) were born at a time of great social, political, economic and religious turbulence in Iran, and in their early childhood were only accustomed to the turmoil of the period.

Childhood
As younger children, the older cohort of the Burnt Generation shaped their future dreams based on their parents' values and lifestyle. These values described success, convenience and social acceptance as simply achievable goals through hard work and right education. Their parents, a Baby Boomer–like generation, had rebuilt the country after World War II, established public education, a secular society, as well as an industrialised one, significantly advanced women’s rights, nationalized the oil industry, and enhanced the public health system. As such, their parents in adulthood lived through and enjoyed the benefits the White Revolution brought to Iran in the 1960s and 1970s, including a high standard of living and stable, well-paying employment. Therefore, the older cohort were able to enjoy to some extent a prosperous early childhood, but after the Revolution suddenly found their entire lives in turmoil at a young age. Although by the late 1970s, in the aftermath of the 1973 oil crisis, there was a steadily-growing dissatisfaction with the government and the Shah’s approach to a variety of political and social issues, as well the system of absolute monarchy in Iran, the assumption that the parents of the Burnt Generation made at the time was that those issues would be resolved through a democratic system.

Iranian Revolution
During the Revolution, and after the Shah was overthrown, the chaos that erupted in Iran, resulting in the consolidation of the Revolution, violence between various political groups and the new government, and the outbreak of the Iran-Iraq War, as well as the rapid change in values in Iran, created a hopeless environment that deeply affected the beliefs and values of the Burnt Generation. During the 1980s, as children and teenagers, they were politicised much earlier than previous Iranian generations, being required by the new Islamic Republic to take part in anti-America and anti-Israel demonstrations, being fed political and religious rhetoric in mosques, as well as being forced to accept the political complexities and realities of the Iran-Iraq War at a young age. As such, during this period, they were notably a religious generation, seeking comfort in religion, and were made to not question authority, resulting in them sharing much of the Islamic Republic’s ideological beliefs in the 1980s and in the first half of the 1990s. Due to the turmoil of the late 1970s and 1980s in Iran, the Burnt Generation experienced significant trauma and loss when they were young - it was common to witness much of their family to be killed or displaced during the Iran-Iraq War. As such, they have notably poor mental health, having high amounts of wartime trauma and PTSD from the war, though much of it remains undiagnosed due to the sense of repression many in the generation imposed on themselves. Due to the use of child soldiers by the Iranian government, many of the men in the generation fought in the war at a time when they were underage, many as young as 13, contributing to many of the men in the generation struggling to re-integrate into Iranian society after the war.

The aftermath of the Revolution, particularly the Cultural Revolution and the shutting down of colleges and universities for several years in the 1980s, as well as the significant impact the war had in limiting education for many young Iranians, resulted in much of the generation receiving a poor education - a significant contrast to that of their parents. After colleges and universities eventually reopened, every applicant had to pass an interview with the government-approved committees and women were only allowed to apply for certain limited majors. As they grew up, the Burnt Generation were forced to be resilient - the war in particular contributed to a sense of resilience amongst children growing up throughout the 1980s. They are often recognised as such in Iran for possessing strong resilience, and adaptability to cope with situations of turmoil. In recent years, they have come to take on more positions of power in the country due to such resilience, though as adults they often have a very poor relationship with their parents, who they often blame for the Revolution and resent for destroying their prospects.

Adulthood and economic prospects
As they entered adulthood at the end of the 1980s, and throughout the 1990s, they notably began to grow suspicious of authority, distrustful of religion, and established themselves as politically alienated from Iran’s political realities. In the 1990s, with the war over and Khomeini’s death in 1989 resulting in the establishment of debate over the future of the Islamic Republic, they grew defiant of the values they had once submissively adhered to in their youth, culminating in the 1999 student protests. They progressively grew angrier at Iran’s stagnating economy and the ineffectiveness of its leadership, as well as the loss of their innocence as children. For much of their adult life, especially in the 1990s and into the 2000s, they have struggled to find employment; in 2008 unemployment amongst the generation ran at 50 percent, and officially half the population lived below the poverty line.  Their prospects in life are not good and many of the graduates in generation were reported to be “lucky” to even get jobs as taxi drivers. As such, on average they are poorer than their parents and have struggled to raise families as they become middle-aged in the ease that their parents did, culminating in a declining birth rate.

Later life and attitudes
Today, as they approach being middle-aged, they are marked by lack of optimism for the future, nihilism, cynicism, skepticism, political apathy, resilience, alienation and distrust in traditional values and institutions, which describe the similarities between Gen X and the Burnt Generation. They possess much anger at the current Iranian government, as well as their parents for the Revolution. As a result of growing up in a chaotic environment, and being conditioned in their youth to be submissive and obedient to the values of the Islamic Republic; anti-Western, devoutly religious and serving to the nation when needed (such as serving as child soldiers in the Iran-Iraq War), they are often completely distrustful of religion and God, being largely responsible for the dramatic drop in mosque attendance that has occurred in Iran since the early 1990s. As they grow older, they have also become much more vocal in anti-government demonstrations and have come to pass down much of their values to younger generations in Iran - resulting in a surge of anti-government activity since the mid-2010s. Some do believe in God, but disconnect themselves from any religious beliefs or groups. Their most common values include loyalty to family and friends, compassion, resilience, and high work ethics. A common spokesperson for the generation is often seen to be the activist Masih Alinejad, who expresses much of their values in her activism. A good way to understand the perspective and perception of life of the Burnt Generation can be seen from the Persepolis comics, which are often seen as embodying the childhood perils of the generation. The uncertainties of their future, either for those who lived in Iran or elsewhere, have left a deep sense of insecurity and frustration in the Burnt Generation.

References

Society of Iran
Cultural generations